In Chinese philosophy, xin refers to the "heart" and "mind". Literally, xin refers to the physical heart, though it also refers to the "mind" as the ancient Chinese believed the heart was the center of human cognition. However, emotion and reason were not considered as separate, but rather as coextensive; xin is as much cognitive as emotional, being simultaneously associated with thought and feeling. For these reasons, it is also often translated as "heart-mind". It has a connotation of intention, yet can be used to refer to long-term goals.

Confucianism 
Xunzi, an important early Confucian thinker, considered xin to be cultivated during one's life, in contrast to innate qualities of xing, or human nature.

Daoism 
A Daoist view, specifically that of Zhuang Zhou, describes xin as being socialised, with environmental pressures influencing personal intentions, sometimes in such a way that can provoke disagreements and conflict. Whereas Confucians viewed it necessary to cultivate xin to develop de, or moral virtue, Zhuang Zhou considered this socialisation to be detrimental to one's personal nature.

References

Bibliography

 
 
 
 

Chinese words and phrases
Concepts in Chinese philosophy
Philosophy of mind
Feeling
Confucianism
Taoist philosophy